Qarah Qanlu or Qareh Qanlu may refer to:
 Qareh Qanlu, East Azerbaijan
 Qarah Qanlu, Bojnord, North Khorasan
 Qarah Qanlu, Maneh and Samalqan, North Khorasan